The 2000 Stratford-on-Avon District Council election took place on 4 May 2000 to elect members of Stratford-on-Avon District Council in Warwickshire, England. One third of the council was up for election and the Conservative Party gained overall control of the council from no overall control.

After the election, the composition of the council was
Conservative 28
Liberal Democrat 18
Independent 7
Labour 2

Campaign
18 of the 55 seats on the council were contested in the election with the Conservatives defending 9, Liberal Democrats 5, Labour 2 and independents 2. The Conservatives contested all 18 seats and needed to make 4 gains to take overall control of the council.

The election in Stratford-on-Avon saw a trial of electronic voting in an attempt to increase turnout. However, there were some computer problems and delays in closing polling stations, which meant that results were delayed by an hour.

Election result
The results saw the Conservatives achieve a majority on the council, 5 years after they lost the majority. They gained the 4 seats they had required, after winning 2 seats from the Liberal Democrats in Bidford and Stratford New Town wards, and 2 from Labour in Southam and Studley. As a result, the Conservative leader on the council, Bob Stevens, took over the leadership of the council from Liberal Democrat, Susan Juned.

Ward results

References

2000 English local elections
2000
20th century in Warwickshire